Massimo Venier (born 26 March 1967) is an Italian film director and screenwriter.

Filmography
Three Men and a Leg (1997)
That's Life (1998)
Ask Me If I'm Happy (2000)
The Legend of Al, John and Jack (2002)
Do You Know Claudia? (2004)
I Trust You (2007)
Generation 1000 Euros (2009)
One Day More (2011)
Wannabe Widowed (2013)
I Hate Summer (2020)

References

External links
 

1967 births
Living people
People from Varese
Italian film directors
Italian screenwriters